The Sewanee Tigers college football team represents Sewanee: The University of the South (Sewanee) in National Collegiate Athletic Association (NCAA) Division III. The school is a founding member of the Southern Athletic Association (SAA), a conference chartered in 2011 by seven former members of the Southern Collegiate Athletic Conference (SCAC) and one other invited member that played its first season in 2012. Sewanee had been a charter member of the SCAC as well. The program has had 30 head coaches since it began play during the 1891 season. Since March 2017, Travis Rundle has served as Sewanee's head coach.

The team has played more than 970 games over 116 seasons. In that time, Seven coaches won conference championships: John Gere Jayne, Billy Suter, and Harris G. Cope won a combined three as a member of the Southern Intercollegiate Athletic Association (SIAA); and Shirley Majors, Horace Moore, Bill Samko and John Windham won a combined ten as a member of the CAC/SCAC. Majors is the leader in seasons coached and games won, with 172 victories during his 21 years with the program. James John Quill and Arthur G. Erwin have the highest winning percentage of those who have coached more than one game, with .889. Robert Black has the lowest winning percentage of those who have coached more than one game, with .105. Of the 30 different head coaches who have led the Tigers, and Harvey Harman has been inducted as head coaches into the College Football Hall of Fame in South Bend, Indiana.

Key

Coaches

Notes

References 
General

 Sewanee Coaching Records. College Football Data Warehouse. Retrieved 2011-08-18.
 

Specific

Lists of college football head coaches

Tennessee sports-related lists